Tylimanthus pseudosaccatus is a bryophyte, a species from the liverwort family Acrobolbaceae. The family grows on logs, rocks, and soil. Under certain circumstances, however, they are epiphyte, growing on other plant species.

Features 
The leaves of Tylimanthus pseudosaccatus, have a shallow depression at the tip, and the margin is finely toothed. The leaves are very fine and are translucent green. The Tylimanthus pseudosaccatus are also robust in size. The finely toothed margins distinguish Tylimanthus pseudosaccatus from other members in the Acrobolbaceae family. The most distinctive feature, however, is the reproductive structure. The position of the reproductive structures most accurately distinguishes the Tylimanthus pseudosaccatus from any other species. The sporophyte (reproductive structure) develops in a pouch at the shoot apex structure.

Tylimanthus pseudosaccatus was initially categorised as a member of Marsupidium. Due to vegetative and morphological similarities, they were re-categorised due to the positioning of the gametangia (reproductive branches). Due to the similarities between the genera, Tylimanthus pseudosaccatus underwent reclassification as a member of the Acrobolbacea family.

Habitat 
Tylimanthus pseudosaccatus is located in the Southern Hemisphere, found in Australia. They are endemic to south-east Australia in New South Wales, Victoria, and Tasmania. Their habitat requirement consists of environments which retain moisture. Mostly in forests, wet sclerophyll forests or they could also be found in rainforests. The liverworts are found in environments which are either middle-aged or old-growth forests, as these provide the bryophytes with protection.

Liverworts are significant in their habitats as their presence in an environment offers microhabitats. The importance of the microhabitats is that it creates an environment which is essential for the survival of other organisms. These organisms include protozoa, invertebrates, and eukaryotes. The reasoning for why they create important microhabitats is due to bryophytes been nitrogen fixers. Other organisms depend on nitrogen as it allows for those species to grow and develop, overall improving the quality of the soil.

References

Further reading
Kantvilas G and Jarman SJ. 2012. Lichens and bryophytes in Tasmanian wet eucalypt forest: floristics, conservation and ecology. Phytotaxa 59: 1-31.

Plants described in 1963
Jungermanniales